Mezmazak (also, Mazmazak) is a village in the Lachin Rayon of Azerbaijan.

References 

Populated places in Lachin District
Villages in Azerbaijan